The Shields, also called the Shields 30 and the Shields One-Design, is an American trailerable sailboat that was designed by Olin Stephens of Sparkman & Stephens as a one design racer and first built in 1962.

Production
The design was commissioned  by American sailor Cornelius Shields, as a fiberglass replacement for the 1930s vintage International One Design and is Sparkman & Stephens design #1720. Shields had the first 20 boats constructed at Cape Cod Shipbuilding and he donated them to several American universities  on the US east coast. The boat class was named after him in honor of his donations. In the end he donated over 100 of the boats to various colleges and universities, including 15 donated to universities in southern California.

The design was initially built by Cape Cod Shipbuilding, then by Chris-Craft Industries and by Hinckley Yachts in the United States. Today it is once again built by Cape Cod Shipbuilding and remains in production. A total of 220 boats have been produced.

Design

The Shields is a racing keelboat, built predominantly of fiberglass, with teak wood trim, including teak coamings, toe-rails, handrails, the cockpit floor grating and the cockpit seats. It has a fractional sloop rig with aluminum spars. The hull has a spooned, raked stem; a sharply raised counter, angled transom; a keel-mounted rudder controlled by a tiller and a fixed modified long keel. There is no cabin. It displaces  and carries  of lead ballast.

For sailing the design is equipped with a halyard winch console, with vertical cleats to secure the halyards. The design rules limit the adjustable backstay, the boom vang and the mainsheet to a maximum of an 8:1 mechanical advantage. A jib is used, but a genoa is not permitted under class rules. Buoyancy is provided by under-seat flotation compartments and fore and aft watertight bulkheads. A spinnaker of  may be used.

The current Cape Cod production boat has, as standard equipment, a 4:1 boom vang, 8:1 backstay and a 4:1 mainsheet traveler. Optional equipment includes a bilge pump, spinnaker and launch basket, Cunningham, a digital compass and a boat trailer for ground transportation.

The design has a Portsmouth Yardstick DP-N racing average handicap of 83.8 (listed as "suspect").

Operational history

The boat is supported by an active class club that organizes racing events, the Shields Class Sailing Association. There are racing fleets in the Northeastern United States and in California.

The Orange Coast College School of Sailing & Seamanship, a public community college in Costa Mesa, California operates a fleet of Shields for their training program, mostly consisting of boats donated by Shields.

In a 1994 review Richard Sherwood wrote, "this beautiful boat is used for day sailing and, particularly, for racing. Class rules are rigid. For example, only one set of sails is allowed per year."

See also
List of sailing boat types

Similar sailboats
Knarr (keelboat)

References

External links

Official website

Keelboats
1960s sailboat type designs
Sailing yachts
Sailboat type designs by Olin Stephens
Trailer sailers
Sailboat types built by Cape Cod Shipbuilding
Sailboat types built by Hinckley Yachts
Sailboat types built by Chris-Craft Industries